Mikalai Novikau (born 13 June 1986) is a Belarusian weightlifter competing in the 85 kg category. He finished eighth at the 2012 Summer Olympics. Novikau won a gold medal at the 2009 and 2010 European Weightlifting Championships.

References 

Belarusian male weightlifters
1986 births
Living people
Weightlifters at the 2012 Summer Olympics
Olympic weightlifters of Belarus
20th-century Belarusian people
21st-century Belarusian people